Sevdalina Teokharova (born 24 July 1974) is a Bulgarian rower. She competed in the women's quadruple sculls event at the 1992 Summer Olympics.

References

1974 births
Living people
Bulgarian female rowers
Olympic rowers of Bulgaria
Rowers at the 1992 Summer Olympics
Place of birth missing (living people)